A Thinking School is an accreditation organised through the University of Exeter. Schools are noted for the use of thinking tools.
Thinking schools are a fusion of work on cognitive development and the work on managing educational change in schools.

Thinking schools adopt two or more existing thinking strategies such as Feuerstein's theory of Structured Cognitive Modifiability, Lipman's Philosophy for Children, or De Bono's Six Hat Thinking. But Thinking schools must have the written backing of governors, management, ownership by the staff and to broadcast their adoption on the school website. They must appoint a senior manager to drive the changes. The problems are institutional and schools can slide back to a 'regurgitation of information by means of timed assessment tasks' approach.

The focus must embrace planning through lesson integration, assemblies, the reward system and the pastoral house system if one is in place. This develops and enhances the pupil/student's self confidence, increase motivation and ultimate academic achievement.

Accreditation 
It is a whole school process that starts with the planning.
Thinking Skills
Reflectional Questioning
Visual Mapping
Collaborative Networking
Developing Dispositions
Structuring the Environment
Accreditation is organised through the University of Exeter.

Thinking tools
Thinking Tools and Strategies taught to and used by the students
Thinking Maps
Thinking Hats
Thinkers’ Keys
 Habits of Mind  
CoRT Thinking Tools
 Q-matrix
 SMART targeting
 Growth mindsets
 Philosophy for Children

They were worked up by Terry Heick in 2017 to describe strategies for classroom practice.
These are not exclusive: there are many approaches one can use in the classroom with the aim of supporting the student.

Thinkers’ Keys 
The Thinkers Keys consist of 20 strategies for generating intellectual rigour, and developing advanced learning strategies. These are usually shown as a set of twenty cards, which are divided into two groups:
Critical /Organisational: perspectives, purpose, decisions, question, three whys, info, rubrics, action, consequences, reflection
Creative /Innovative: improvements, brainstorming, predictions, in common, combination, BAR, initiative, brickwall, challenge, reverse

References

External links (Thinking schools) 
Official website
Ofsted/ Estyn/ ETI Inspections and Thinking Schools

Educational accreditation